The 2022 Challenger Coquimbo was a professional tennis tournament played on clay courts. It was part of the 2022 ATP Challenger Tour. It took place in Coquimbo, Chile between 9 and 14 May 2022.

Singles main-draw entrants

Seeds

 Rankings are as of 2 May 2022.

Other entrants
The following players received wildcards into the singles main draw:
  Pedro Boscardin Dias
  Santiago Rodríguez Taverna
  Nicolás Villalón

The following players received entry into the singles main draw as alternates:
  Román Andrés Burruchaga
  Matías Franco Descotte

The following players received entry from the qualifying draw:
  Murkel Dellien
  Arklon Huertas del Pino
  Conner Huertas del Pino
  Wilson Leite
  Naoki Nakagawa
  João Lucas Reis da Silva

Champions

Singles

 Facundo Díaz Acosta def.  Pedro Boscardin Dias 7–5, 7–6(7–4).

Doubles

 Guillermo Durán /  Nicolás Mejía def.  Diego Hidalgo /  Cristian Rodríguez 6–4, 1–6, [10–7].

References

2022 ATP Challenger Tour
2022 in Chilean tennis
May 2022 sports events in South America
Challenger Coquimbo